The Västerbottens Fotbollförbund (Västerbotten Football Association) is one of the 24 district organisations of the Swedish Football Association. It administers lower tier football in Västerbotten County.

Background 

Västerbottens Fotbollförbund, commonly referred to as Västerbottens FF, is the governing body for football in the historical province of Västerbotten, which largely corresponds with present day Västerbotten County. The Association was founded on 16 March 1924 and currently has 135 member clubs.  Based in Skellefteå, the Association's Chairman is Magnus Stenberg.

Affiliated Members 

The following clubs are affiliated to the Västerbottens FF:

Adak SK
Bastuträsk SK
Bergsbyns SK
Betsele FF
Betsele IF
Bjurholms IF
BK Nila
BK Solbacken
Blattnicksele IF
Blåviksjöns IF
Bolidens FFI
Bureå IF
Burträsk FF
Burträsk IK
Burträsk Ungdomsfotboll BK
Bygdeå GOIF
Bygdsiljums SK
Byske IF
Clemensnäs IF
Dorotea BK
Dorotea IF
Drängsmark/Ostvik IF
Ersboda FF
Ersboda SK
Ersmarks IK
Falmarks Fritids O IK
FC Mary's Home
Flarkens IK
Flurkmarks IK
Fromhedens IF
Furunäs/Bullmarks IK
Gimonäs Umeå IF
Gräsmyrs IK
Gunnarns IK
Hås FF
Hissjö SK
Hjoggböle IF
Hjoggsjö IF
Höglands AIK
Höjdens BK
Hörnefors IF
Hörnsjö IF
IFK Åkullsjön
IFK Ålund
IFK Anderstorp-Skellefteå
IFK Bjurfors
IFK Holmsund
IFK Kristineberg
IFK Rundvik
IFK Umeå
IK Klintarna
Innervik SK
Jörns IF
Kågedalens AIF
Klutmarks IF
Kusfors IK
Lilljansberget IF
Ljusvattnets IF
Lövånger-Uttersjöbäcken AIK
Lycksele FF
Lycksele IF
Malå IF
Malgoviks GOIF
Mariehem FF
Mariehem SK
Medle SK
Minerva IF
Mjödvattnets IF
Mjövallens BK
Morön BK
Morön City BK
Myckle IK
Nordmalings BK
Norrlångträsk IK
Norsjö IF
Norum-Djäkneboda SK
Nysätra IF
Obbola IK
Ormsjö IF
Ostvik/Drängsmark IK
Ragvaldsträsk IF
Renbergsvattnets IF
Risliden/Lossmens SK
Röbäcks IF
Robertsfors BK
Robertsfors IK
Rödåbygdens IK
Rönnskär Railcare IF
Rusksele FF
Sandåkernkamraternas IF
Sandåkerns SK
Sandsele SK
Sandviks IK
Sävar IK
Sjöbottens FF
SK Örnvingen
SK Storm
Skellefteå Fotbollsförening
Slipstensjöns IF
Södra Ungdom FF
Sörböle FF
Sörfors IF
Sörmjöle IK
Sorsele IF
Spöland Vännäs IF
Stämningsgården IK
Stöcke IF
Storumans IK
Sunnanå SK
Svanaby IF
Täfteå IK
Tärnafjällens IF
Tavelsjö Allmänna IK
Tegs SK
Tegs United FF
Tvärålunds IF
Umeå FC
Umeå IK
Umeå Södra FF
Umedalens FF
Umedalens IF
Umekamraternas FF
Umgransele Byaförening
Vallens IS
Vännäs AIK
Vännäs AIK DFF
Varuträsk IF
Vebomarks IF
Vilhelmina IK
Vilhelmina UIK
Vindelns IF
Åbyns IF
Åmlidens IF
Åmsele SK
Åsele IK

League Competitions 
Västerbottens FF run the following League Competitions:

Men's Football
Division 4  -  two sections
Division 5  -  three sections
Division 6  -  four sections

Women's Football
Division 3  -  one section
Division 4  -  three sections

Footnotes

External links 
 Västerbottens FF Official Website 

Vasterbotten
Football in Västerbotten County
Sports organizations established in 1924
1924 establishments in Sweden